Thomas Brewer may refer to:
Thomas Brewer (composer) (1611 – 1660), English composer best known for introducing the glee form
Thomas Brewer (writer) ( 1624), English writer
Thomas Mayo Brewer (1814–1880), American naturalist
Thomas Brewer (cricketer) (1868–?), English cricketer
Thomas Brewer (activist) (1894–1956), American civil rights activist
Thomas Bowman Brewer (born 1932), sixth chancellor of East Carolina University
Tom Brewer (1931–2018), American baseball player
Tom Brewer (politician) (born 1958), American politician in the Nebraska Legislature